Saint Paul's Well is a water well in Tarsus, Turkey, claimed to have belonged to Paul the Apostle (then named Saul) when he lived there. The well, along with Saint Paul's Church, is on the UNESCO Tentative list of World Heritage Sites in Turkey and is under the control of the public authorities.

Tarsus, currently a part of Mersin Province, was an important Roman city in the first century. The ruins of Saint Paul's house, as well as the still-serviceable well in the old quarters of Tarsus, were unearthed during a rescue excavation in 1999. Restored old houses and the ancient road in Tarsus are located nearby. 

References

 Tarsus, Mersin
 Paul the Apostle
 World Heritage Sites in Turkey
 Water wells
 Archaeological sites in Turkey
 Archaeological sites of classical Anatolia
 Pilgrimage sites